Ahmed ʻUrabi (31 March 1841 – 21 September 1911), also known as Ahmed Ourabi or Orabi Pasha, was an officer of the Egyptian army. The first political and military leader in Egypt to rise from the fellahin, ʻUrabi participated in an 1879 mutiny that developed into the ʻUrabi revolt against the administration of Khedive Tewfik, which was under the influence of an Anglo-French consortium. He was promoted to Tewfik's cabinet and began reforms of Egypt's military and civil administrations, but the demonstrations in Alexandria of 1882 prompted a British bombardment and invasion which led to the capture of ʻUrabi and his allies and the imposition of British control in Egypt. ʻUrabi and his allies were sentenced by Tewfik into exile far away in Ceylon, as a form of punishment.

Early life
He was born in 1841 in the village of Hirriyat Razna near Zagazig in the Sharqia Governorate, approximately 80 kilometres to the north of Cairo. ʻUrabi was the son of a village leader and one of the wealthier members of the community, which allowed him to receive a decent education. After completing elementary education in his home village, he enrolled at Al-Azhar University to complete his schooling in 1849. He entered the army and moved up quickly through the ranks, reaching lieutenant colonel by age 20. The modern education and military service of ʻUrabi, from a fellah, or peasant background, would not have been possible without the modernising reforms of Khedive Ismail, who had done much to eliminate the barriers between the bulk of the Egyptian populace and the ruling elite, who were drawn largely from the military castes that had ruled Egypt for centuries. Ismail abolished the exclusive access to the Egyptian and Sudanese military ranks by Egyptians of Balkan, Circassian, and Turkish origin. Ismail conscripted soldiers and recruited students from throughout Egypt and Sudan regardless of class and ethnic backgrounds in order to form a "modern" and "national" Egyptian military and bureaucratic elite class. Without these reforms, ʻUrabi's rise through the ranks of the military would likely have been far more restricted.

ʻUrabi served during the Ethiopian-Egyptian War (1874-1876) in a support role on the Egyptian Army's lines of communication. He is said to have returned from the war - which Egypt lost - "incensed at the way in which it had been mismanaged", and the experience turned him towards politics and decisively against the Khedive.

Protest against Tewfik 
He was a galvanizing speaker. Because of his peasant origins, he was at the time, and is still today, viewed as an authentic voice of the Egyptian people. Indeed, he was known by his followers as 'El Wahid' (the Only One), and when the British poet and explorer Wilfrid Blunt went to meet him, he found the entrance of ʻUrabi's house was blocked with supplicants. When Khedive Tewfik issued a new law preventing peasants from becoming officers, ʻUrabi led the group protesting the preference shown to aristocratic officers (again, largely Egyptians of foreign descent). ʻUrabi repeatedly condemned severe prevalent racial discrimination of ethnic Egyptians in the army. He and his followers, who included most of the army, were successful and the law was repealed. In 1879 they formed the Egyptian Nationalist Party in the hopes of fostering a stronger national identity.

He and his allies in the army joined with the reformers in February 1882 to demand change. This revolt, also known as the ʻUrabi revolt, was primarily inspired by his desire for social justice for the Egyptians based on equal standing before the law. With the support of the peasants as well, he launched a broader effort to try to wrest Egypt and Sudan from foreign control, and also to end the absolutist regime of the Khedive, who was himself subject to European influence under the rules of the Caisse de la Dette Publique. The Arab-Egyptian deputies demanded a constitution that granted the state parliamentary power. The revolt then spread to express resentment of the undue influence of foreigners, including the predominantly Turko-Circassian aristocracy from other parts of the Ottoman Empire.

Parliament planning 
ʻUrabi was first promoted to Bey, then made under-secretary of war, and ultimately a member of the cabinet. Plans were developed to create a parliamentary assembly. During the last months of the revolt (July to September 1882), it was claimed that ʻUrabi held the office of Prime Minister of the hastily created common law government based on popular sovereignty. Feeling threatened, Khedive Tewfik requested assistance against ʻUrabi from the Ottoman Sultan, to whom Egypt and Sudan still owed technical fealty. The Sublime Porte hesitated in responding to the request.

British intervention 

The British were especially concerned that ʻUrabi would default on Egypt's massive debt and that he might try to gain control of the Suez Canal. Therefore, they and the French dispatched warships to Egypt to prevent such an eventuality from occurring. Tewfik fled to their protection, moving his court to Alexandria. The strong naval presence spurred fears of an imminent invasion (as had been the case in Tunisia in 1881) causing anti-Christian riots to break out in Alexandria on 12 June 1882. The French fleet was recalled to France, while the Royal Navy warships in the harbor opened fire on the city's artillery emplacements after the Egyptians ignored an ultimatum from Admiral Seymour to remove them. In September a British army landed in Alexandria but failed to reach Cairo after being checked at the Battle of Kafr El Dawwar. Another army, led by Sir Garnet Wolseley, landed in the Canal Zone and on 13 September 1882 they defeated ʻUrabi's army at the Battle of Tell El Kebir. From there, the British force advanced on Cairo which surrendered without a shot being fired, as did ʻUrabi and the other nationalist leaders.

Exile and return 
ʻUrabi was tried by the restored Khedivate for rebellion on 3 December 1882.  He was defended by British solicitor Richard Eve and Alexander Meyrick Broadley. According to Elizabeth Thompson, ʻUrabi's defense stressed the idea that despite the fact that he had been illegally incarcerated by Riyad Pasha and the Khedive Tewfik he had still responded in a manner allowed under Egyptian law and with the hopes that the khedivate remain after his intervention, thus demonstrating loyalty to the Egyptian people as required by his duties. In accordance with an understanding made with the British representative, Lord Dufferin, ʻUrabi pleaded guilty and was sentenced to death, but the sentence was immediately commuted to one of banishment for life. He left Egypt on 28 December 1882 for Ceylon (now Sri Lanka). His home in Halloluwa Road, Kandy (formerly owned by Mudaliyar Jeronis de Soysa) is now the Orabi Pasha Cultural Center. During his time in Ceylon, ʻUrabi worked to improve the quality of education amongst the Muslims in the country. Hameed Al Husseinie College, Sri Lanka's first school for Muslims was established on 15 November 1884 and after eight years Zahira College, was established on 22 August 1892 under his patronage.  In May 1901, Khedive Abbas II, Tewfik's son and successor permitted ʻUrabi to return to Egypt. Abbas was a nationalist in the vein of his grandfather, Khedive Ismail the Magnificent, and remained deeply opposed to British influence in Egypt. ʻUrabi returned on 1 October 1901, and remained in Egypt until his death on 21 September 1911.

Legacy
While the British intervention was meant to be a temporary state of affairs, British forces continued to occupy Egypt for decades afterwards. In 1914, fearing that the nationalist Khedive Abbas II would form an alliance with the Ottoman Empire against the United Kingdom during the First World War, the British administration in Egypt deposed him in favour of his uncle, Hussein Kamel. The legal fiction of Ottoman sovereignty was terminated, and the Sultanate of Egypt that had been destroyed by the Ottomans in 1517 was re-established, with Hussein Kamel as Sultan. No longer an Ottoman vassal state, Egypt was declared a British protectorate. Five years later, nationalist opposition to the United Kingdom's continued dominance of Egyptian affairs sparked the Egyptian Revolution of 1919, prompting the British to formally recognise Egypt as an independent sovereign state in 1922.

ʻUrabi's revolt had a profound and long-lasting impact on Egypt, surpassing even the efforts of resistance hero Omar Makram in its significance as an expression of nationalistic sentiments in Egypt. It would later play a very important role in Egyptian history, with some historians noting that the 1881-1882 revolution laid the foundation for mass politics in Egypt. In July 1952, when Mohamed Naguib, one of the two principal leaders of the Egyptian Revolution of 1952, addressed crowds of supporters in Cairo's Ismailia Square on the toppling of King Farouk, he consciously linked this 20th century revolution to 'Urabi's revolt against the Egyptian monarch seven decades earlier, reciting 'Urabi's words to Khedive Tewfik that the people of Egypt were "no longer inheritable" by any ruler. The new revolutionary government mimicked 'Urabi in declaring that Ismailia Square, the main public plaza in Cairo, henceforth be Tahrir Square (Liberation Square). During the tenure of Gamal Abdel Nasser, who led the Revolution with Naguib and succeeded him as Prime Minister and later President, ʻUrabi would to be hailed as an Egyptian patriot and a national hero. He also inspired political activists living in Ceylon.

Tributes

Egypt
 Alexandria's Orabi Square
 Cairo's Al Mohandessin district has a main street and its underground station named after him.
 Zagazig's main square contains an equestrian statue of ʻUrabi, and its university's emblem bears his picture

Abroad
 Arabi, Louisiana, a suburb of New Orleans, was named in honour of 'Urabi as the residents of the suburb felt a sense of solidarity with him due to the fact that they were a part of New Orleans which sought to separate from the city.
 The Gaza Strip has a coastal road named Ahmed Orabi Street.
 Kandy, Sri Lanka, is home to the Orabi Pasha Cultural Centre.

Quotes 
 "How can you enslave people when their mothers bore them free?". The reference is: Once a governor of Egypt punished a non-Muslim wrongly, the case was brought to the caliph of time i.e. Umar ibn ul Khattab (the second Caliph of Islam), the Muslim governor was proven to be wrong, Umar told the non Muslim to punish the governor in same fashion, after it Umar said: Since when have you considered people as your slaves? Although their mothers gave birth to them as free living people.
 "Allah has created us free, and did not make us into heritage or estate. So by Allah, the only god, we shall be bequeathed or enslaved no more"

Notes 
 The earliest published work of Isabella Augusta, Lady Gregory – later to embrace Irish Nationalism and have an important role in the cultural life of Ireland – was Arabi and His Household (1882), a pamphlet (originally a letter to The Times newspaper) in support of ʻUrabi.

References

Further reading
 Huffaker, Shauna. "Representations of Ahmed Urabi: Hegemony, Imperialism, and the British Press, 1881–1882." Victorian Periodicals Review 45.4 (2012): 375-405.

External links 
 
 

1841 births
1911 deaths
Egyptian Muslims
19th-century prime ministers of Egypt
19th-century rebels
Al-Azhar University alumni
Prime Ministers of Egypt
Defence Ministers of Egypt
Egyptian nationalists
Egyptian soldiers
Egyptian revolutionaries
People from Zagazig
People of the 'Urabi revolt
Egyptian exiles
People from Sharqia Governorate
Egyptian prisoners sentenced to death
Egyptian pashas
Egyptian rebels
Egyptian independence activists